Grindelia fraxinipratensis, common name Ash Meadows gumweed, is a North American species of flowering plants in the family Asteraceae. It is native to the southwestern United States, in Mojave Desert regions in Nye County in Nevada and Inyo County in California. Some of the Nevada populations (including the type locality) lie inside the Nevada Test Site of the United States Atomic Energy Commission

Some sources spell the name as G. fraxino-pratensis. Grindelia fraxinipratensis is the accepted spelling according to the International Code of Nomenclature.

Grindelia fraxinipratensis grows in meadows and on the borders of woodlands. It grows from a thick underground caudex atop a woody taproot. The inflorescence bears one to four flower heads lined with thick phyllaries. The fruit is an achene with a pappus made up of two awns.

Grindelia fraxinipratensis is native to the Amargosa Valley along the southern part of the border between California and Nevada, where it is known from only 14 to 16 locations. Many are found within the Ash Meadows National Wildlife Refuge in the Amargosa Desert area.

The plant grows in the clay, saline and alkaline soils of the land surrounding desert warm springs in the valley. Its main habitat type is the saltgrass meadow (Distichlis spicata). It is relatively abundant in the moist areas of its habitat, and rare in the drier areas.

Grindelia fraxinipratensisis a federally listed threatened species. Habitat in the area was first altered when peat mining was started and Carson Slough, a large local wetland, was drained. The area was then farmed. Large scale farming by corporate agriculture altered much of the Ash Meadows habitat. Today a main threat to the species is the lowering of the water table, which may move water supplies too deep into the soil for the plant to reach with its roots. Other threats include trampling by feral horses and cattle, off-road vehicle use, and non-native plant species.

References

fraxinipratensis
Flora of California
Flora of Nevada
Endemic flora of the United States
Natural history of the Mojave Desert
Natural history of Inyo County, California
Plants described in 1972